Fegor Ogude (born 29 July 1987) is a Nigerian former football player who played as a central midfielder or centre-back.

Career

Club
He started his senior career in the Nigerian team Warri Wolves, where he was captain.

On 31 August 2010, he signed for Norwegian team Vålerenga. He had been followed closely by the club after being on trial at the club, in the summer of 2009. He also had offers from two other Norwegian clubs, but he chose Vålerenga Oslo.

On 14 January 2014, he signed a contract until June 2016 for Russian team Amkar Perm. In June 2016, Ogude signed a new two-year contract with Amkar Perm.

On 5 July 2018, Ogude signed for Yenisey Krasnoyarsk. Following Yenisey's relegation from the Russian Premier League at the end of the 2018–19 season, Ogude was released by the club.

International
Ogude was selected for the Nigerian national team in an Africa Cup of Nations qualifying match against Madagascar.

He was called up to Nigeria's 23-man squad for the 2013 Africa Cup of Nations. Ogude won the Africa Cup of Nations with Nigeria in 2013.

He was selected for Nigeria's squad at the 2013 FIFA Confederations Cup.

Career statistics

Club

Notes

International

Statistics accurate as of match played 23 June 2013

Honours
Nigeria
Africa Cup of Nations (1): 2013

References

External links 
 Profile at VIF-Fotball.no 
 Signing interview

1987 births
Sportspeople from Lagos
Living people
Nigerian footballers
Nigeria international footballers
Association football midfielders
Warri Wolves F.C. players
Vålerenga Fotball players
FC Amkar Perm players
FC Yenisey Krasnoyarsk players
Eliteserien players
Russian Premier League players
2013 Africa Cup of Nations players
2013 FIFA Confederations Cup players
Africa Cup of Nations-winning players
Nigerian expatriate footballers
Expatriate footballers in Norway
Nigerian expatriate sportspeople in Norway
Expatriate footballers in Russia
Nigerian expatriate sportspeople in Russia